Juyeop Station is a station on Seoul Subway Line 3 in Goyang, Gyeonggi Province.

The name Juyeop is derived from the story that when the village was viewed from the top of the nearby mountain, the topography of the entire village was shaped like a leaf(엽;葉 meaning leaf), and the word Ju(주;注 meaning pour/flow) came from the story of a large leaf flowing down the creek in the middle of village during Autumn.

Station layout

References 

Seoul Metropolitan Subway stations
Metro stations in Goyang
Railway stations opened in 1996
Seoul Subway Line 3